Jan-Olov Gullik "Janne" Nässén (born 8 December 1957) is a Swedish curler and curling coach.

In 1995 he was inducted into the Swedish Curling Hall of Fame.

Teams

Record as a coach of national teams

References

External links
 

Living people
1957 births
Swedish male curlers
Swedish curling coaches
20th-century Swedish people